The Lockheed L-749 Constellation is the first Lockheed Constellation to regularly cross the Atlantic Ocean non-stop. Although similar in appearance to the L-649 before it, the L-749 had a larger fuel capacity, strengthened landing gear, and eventually weather radar.

Design and development 

Due to the increased weight, the landing gear and tires had to be strengthened. These jet stacks increased the noise, requiring more insulation. As with the L-649, ten different layouts of the internal cabin were possible. Airlines originally attracted to the L-649 changed their orders to the L-749. The L-749 was to become the standard version of the regular Constellation.

The L-749 first flew on March 14, 1947, and received certification that same month. The first L-749 was delivered to Air France on April 18, 1947. Pan American World Airways received its first L-749 in June, and L-749 service began the same month on their "Round The World" service. The L-749 also entered service with various other airlines, including Trans World Airlines (TWA), KLM, Cubana de Aviación, Línea Aeropostal Venezolana and Avianca.
  
In March 1947, 1,200 jobs were lost at Lockheed, bringing production of the aircraft to a near stand-still. This was due to the end of military production from World War II bringing a reduction in the number of needed workers. A large order from the United States Air Force for 10 L-749As, designated C-121 Constellation, saved the Constellation program from cancellation. The United States Navy followed in, ordering two L-749As as PO-1Ws (later WV-1s). The first L-749A off the production lines were destined for the military.

Lockheed started producing the improved L-749A in 1949. It had a strengthened fuselage, further strengthened landing gear and a Plycor floor. Slightly redesigned engine cowlings and new Curtiss Electric propellers were also introduced. Lockheed also offered a L-749 to L-749A conversion kit. The first civil customer for the L-749A was South African Airways but its largest customer was TWA, which had 26 L-749As; the last of these were not retired until 1967. A cargo version of the L-749A based on the military C-121A was offered, but no airlines showed interest and it never left the drawing board. An L-749B turboprop version was envisaged, but this too never left the drawing board as no reliable engine was found. Production of the L-749A ended in 1951 to give way to its stretched successor, the L-1049 Super Constellation.

Variants 

L-749
Standard production version, powered by four Wright R-3350-749C18BD-1 radial engines. 60 built.

L-749A
Reinforced structure and an increased MTOW. 59 built.

L-749B
Proposed turboprop version. None built.

L-849
Planned version of L-749 powered by Wright R-3350 TurboCompound engines.

L-949
Proposed Speedfreighter combi version of L-849 with an  fuselage stretch.

Specifications (L-749)

See also

References 
Citations

Bibliography
 Breffort, Dominique. Lockheed Constellation: from Excalibur to Starliner Civilian and Military Variants. Histoire and Collecions, 2006, Paris, France. Print. .

External links

 Lockheed Constellation Survivors - A website that explains information and whereabouts of surviving Constellations of all variants, including the L-749 Constellation.

Constellation
1940s United States airliners
Four-engined tractor aircraft
Low-wing aircraft
L-0749
Aircraft first flown in 1947
Four-engined piston aircraft
Triple-tail aircraft